The 2014 European 10 m Events Championships were held in Moscow, Russia, from February 26 to March 3, 2014.

Men's events

Women's events

Mixed events

Medal table

See also
 European Shooting Confederation
 International Shooting Sport Federation
 List of medalists at the European Shooting Championships
 List of medalists at the European Shotgun Championships

References

External links
 Official web cite
 Official results

European Shooting Championships
European Shooting Championships
2014 European Shooting Championships
European 10 m Events Championships
Sports competitions in Moscow
2014 in Moscow